Chile Route 11 (Ruta 11 CH) is a main road in the northernmost portion of Chile. The route serves as the main access to Quebrada de Cardones Natural Monument and Lauca National Park. 

The western portion of the road stretches along the valley floor of the lower course of the Lluta River. At higher elevations, the road winds through a highly mountainous area.

References

Roads in Chile
Transport in Arica y Parinacota Region